Saraiva is a Portuguese surname (there is also a Hispanicized form, Saravia). It may refer to:

 António Saraiva (1934–2018), simply known by mononym Saraiva, Portuguese footballer
 Bernardo Saraiva (born 1993), Portuguese tennis player
 Ivan Saraiva de Souza (born 1982), Brazilian left back
 João Victor Saraiva (born 1977), Portuguese beach soccer player
 José Antônio Saraiva (1823-1895), Brazilian politician, diplomat and lawyer
 José Hermano Saraiva (1919–2012), Portuguese historian and diplomat
 José Saraiva Martins (born 1932), Portuguese cleric and cardinal
 Otelo Saraiva de Carvalho, GCL (1936–2021), Portuguese military officer
 Ramiro Saraiva Guerreiro (1918–2011), Brazilian politician

See also
 Saravia (disambiguation)

Portuguese-language surnames
Sephardic surnames